Ján Papaj (born 16 June 1979) is a Slovak football player who currently plays for Tatran Liptovský Mikuláš, in the 2. liga.

External links
 
 Futbalnet profile 
 1. FC Tatran Prešov profile 

1979 births
Living people
Slovak footballers
Association football defenders
FC Senec players
1. FC Tatran Prešov players
MFK Tatran Liptovský Mikuláš players
Slovak Super Liga players
Sportspeople from Liptovský Mikuláš
2. Liga (Slovakia) players